Things I Left Behind (Arabic: شدة مصطفى) is a 2020 novel by Palestinian writer Shada Mustafa. It was shortlisted for the Sheikh Zayed Book Award for Literature 2021, Young Author category.

Publication 
Things I Left Behind was originally published in Arabic by Naufal in 2020 and subsequently in English by Banipal. The book was translated into English by Nancy Roberts.

It was written by Palestinian author Shada Mustafa. The book is fictional, although the author described it as a fictional autobiography.

Synopsis 
Things I Left Behind  is about two Palestinian sisters with divorced parents. One sister falls in love with a man in Sweden. The book it set in 2000, and includes themes of Israeli occupation, women's rights, sexuality and family values.

Critical reception 
It was shortlisted for the Sheikh Zayed Book Award for Literature 2021, Young Author category.

Editions 

 Ma Taraktu Khalfi/شدة مصطفى, Naufal (Beirut), 
 Things I Left Behind (English translation by Nancy Roberts), Banipal Book (UK),

References

External links 

 What I Left Behind, publishers official website (Arabic)
 What I Left Behind, publishers official website (English)
 Author interview with The Independent (Arabic)

2020 novels
Works about families
Palestinian books